A Zone for Employment and Economic Development (Spanish: Zonas de empleo y desarrollo económico, or  ZEDE) is a type of administrative division in Honduras (colloquially called a model city) that provides a high level of autonomy with its own political system, at a judicial, economic and administrative level, while still subject to the Honduras government.

Cities were planned to be created to attract investment and generate employment in currently uninhabited parts of the country, or in municipalities that agree to be converted into ZEDE zones. Every zone was to be governed by a technical secretary, elected by a committee that would oversee the adoption of best practices.  The committee was in turn appointed by the president of Honduras.

ZEDEs have been inspired by other successful free trade zones can be found in China (Hong Kong, Macao, Shenzhen, Shanghai), in South Korea (Songdo), and in Singapore.

The concept of a ZEDE was criticized by many in Honduras as an attack on the nation's sovereignty.  In 2022, Honduran president Xiomara Castro signed a measure to repeal the enabling legislation, leaving the existing ZEDEs in limbo.

Objectives 
ZEDE has the following objectives for economic development:
 International logistics centres that permit the processing of goods at a grand scale (such as the Colón Free Trade Zone in Panamá).
 International business courts that resolve disputes between both national and foreign business entities (such as the Isle of Man, United Kingdom).
 Special investment districts that permit the creation of centres for the service sector (such as the Cayman Enterprise City, Cayman Islands).
 Districts for renewable energy that permit investment in renewable energy (such as the solar parks in Arizona, United States).
 Special economic zones in which the laws that govern the economy will be different from the rest of the country. National laws might be suspended in favor of solutions based on a free market. Compare Shenzhen, China.
 Zones subject to a special judicial system that function under a judicial tradition different from the usual (such as the courts in the financial districts of Dubai that are subject to Common Law).
 Special agro-industrial zones that permit incentives for exporting high-quality agricultural products (such as the cultivation of asparagus in Peru).
 Special tourist zones that permit special conditions for creating centres for tourism in undeveloped parts of the country.

Projected impact 
Recently, economists at the Universidad Francisco Marroquín conducted an economic impact analysis examining how ZEDEs might impact the Honduran economy. They found that a ZEDE which resembles the growth rates of China's Special Economic Zones would reach $36,000 GDP per capita by 2050, but such claims are widely disputed.

Current ZEDEs 
List may be incomplete or out of date.

 Próspera - Technology and Services ZEDE. Located next to the village of Crawfish Rock on the Island of Roatan. Prospera's Laws allow for expansion along coastal Honduras. On March 18, 2021 they confirmed the addition of an area near the Satuye area of La Ceiba, labeled as "Port Satuye".
 Ciudad Morazán - Low Income Manufacturing (Maquila) Employee Community and Industrial Zone. Located near the city of Choloma in the Department of Cortes. Phase 1 of the development will entail in a gated low-income housing project. Phase 2 will create manufacturing areas within the gated community.
 ZEDE Orquídea, in Choluteca - For the agricultural industry with the parent company Agroalpha. Located at Las Tapias in the municipality of San Marcos de Colon. Agroalpha will construct a large greenhouse for cultivation of produce for foreign exports. ZEDE Orquídea has adopted the common law of the State of Delaware as its applicable private law.

In April 2022, the Honduran Congress repealed the Constitutional Amendments and Laws that created the ZEDE regime. However, the three existing ZEDE are grandfathered in for a period of 50 years, as per their Legal Stability Agreements, Article 45 of the ZEDE Organic Law, and the Bilateral Investment Treaty with the Government of Kuwait

Potential candidates and failed ZEDEs 

 Unnamed Peña Blanca ZEDE - Originally proposed as the first ZEDE with a focus in the agricultural sector. Peña Blanca was selected for its location near the agricultural and manufacturing region of Valle de Sula. The project ultimately failed to receive local support.
 Unnamed Suyapa ZEDE - Religious tourism ZEDE surrounding Districto Central's Basilica de Suyapa. It failed to receive local support.
 Unnamed Valle ZEDE - Distributed among the three municipalities of Nacaome, Amapala and Alianza. The Valle ZEDE was intended to function as an agricultural and logistics ZEDE, with the department's capital, Nacaome, serving as an agricultural research center, Alianza, on the border with El Salvador, as a logistics free trade zone, and the island city of Amapala as a megaport on the Pacific's Gulf of Fonseca.

See also 
 Dubai - economic centre of the United Arab Emirates
 Free Economic Zone of Manaus in the Brazilian Amazon
 Shenzhen - Special Economic Zone (SEZ) in China

References

External links 
 
 Design competition for ZEDEs by Zaha Hadid Architects

Autonomous administrative divisions
Politics of Honduras
Special economic zones
Economy of Honduras
Planned cities